Woodnut Conwell Stilwell Burr (August 28, 1861 – December 19, 1952) was an ardent worker for women's suffrage in the United States.

Early life
Woodnut Conwell Stilwell Burr was born on August 28, 1861, in Anderson, Indiana, the daughter of Thomas Neel Stilwell (1830–1874) and Winifred Stilwell.

Career

 She was an ardent worker for women's suffrage in the United States and civic betterment.
 She was the president of the Los Gatos Branch of the League of Women Voters.
 She was a member of Work Integrated Learning Programmes and Woman's Christian Temperance Union.

Personal life
Woodnut S. Burr moved to California in 1911 and lived at 11 Peralta St., Los Gatos, California. She married Chauncey S. Burr (1840–1905) and had four children: Chauncey Stilwell Burr (1885–1964), Mrs. Fred Tusler, Mrs. N. J. Lennes, Mary Winifred Burr (1883–1912).

She died on December 19, 1952, in Santa Clara, California, and is buried at Oak Woods Cemetery, Chicago, Illinois.

References

1861 births
People from Anderson, Indiana
1952 deaths
American suffragists
Activists from Indiana
People from Los Gatos, California
Activists from California
Woman's Christian Temperance Union people
Members of the League of Women Voters